Charles M. Grisham is a biochemist and a professor of chemistry at the University of Virginia in Charlottesville, Virginia. He received his B.S. from the Illinois Institute of Technology and his Ph.D. in chemistry from the University of Minnesota. Grisham is a Research Career Development Awardee of the National Institutes of Health and is a member of the American Society for Biochemistry and Molecular Biology.

Grisham has co-authored the textbook entitled Biochemistry with Reginald H. Garrett.

References

American biochemists
Illinois Institute of Technology alumni
Living people
University of Minnesota College of Science and Engineering alumni
University of Virginia faculty
Year of birth missing (living people)